Alhassan Sualihu Dandaawa (born February 17, 1983) is a Ghanaian politician and member of the Seventh Parliament of the Fourth Republic of Ghana representing the Karaga Constituency in the Northern Region on the ticket of the National Democratic Congress.

Personal life 
Dandaawa is a Muslim and is married with a child.

Early life and education 
Dandaawa was born on February 17, 1983. He hails from Karaga, a town in the Northern Region of Ghana. He entered Islamic University College, Accra and obtained his Bachelor of Business Administration degree in Banking and Finance in 2009. He also attended Mouncrest University College, Kanda-Accra and obtained a bachelor of law degree.

Politics 
Dandaawa is a member of the National Democratic Congress (NDC). In 2012, he contested for the Karaga seat on the ticket of the NDC sixth parliament of the fourth republic and won.

Employment 
 Administrative Assistant, Ministry of Foreign Affairs and Regional Integration, Accra
 Member of Parliament (January 7, 2013–present; 2nd term)

References

Ghanaian MPs 2017–2021
1983 births
Living people
Ghanaian Muslims
National Democratic Congress (Ghana) politicians